Ewing may refer to:

People
 Ewing (surname)
 Ewing (given name)

Places
United States
 Ewing Township, Boone County, Arkansas
 Ewing, Illinois, a village
 Ewing Township, Franklin County, Illinois
 Ewing, Indiana, an unincorporated community
 Ewing, Kentucky, a city
 Ewing Township, Michigan
 Ewing, Missouri, a city
 Ewing, Nebraska, a village
 Ewing Township, Holt County, Nebraska
 Ewing Township, New Jersey
 Ewing (unincorporated community), New Jersey, an unincorporated community within the township
 Ewing/Carroll, Trenton, New Jersey, a neighborhood in the city of Trenton
 Ewing, Ohio, an unincorporated community
 Ewing, Angelina County, Texas. a ghost town
 Ewing, Virginia, a census-designated place
 Ewing Yard, a rail yard on the St Louis MetroLink

Elsewhere
 Ewing Island, Antarctica
 Ewing Island, New Zealand
 Ewing Seamount, in the south Atlantic Ocean

Other uses
 Ewing Public Schools, a school district serving Ewing Township, Mercer County, New Jersey
 Ewing High School (disambiguation), multiple schools
 Ewing (constructor), a former racing car constructor
 Ewing (communications consultancy), a Czech strategic communications and PR agency
 USRC Ewing (1841), a United States Revenue Cutter Service vessel built in 1841

See also
 E-wing, a fictional Star Wars spacecraft
Alexander Ewing House, historic house in Tennessee, USA
 Ewing's sarcoma, a type of bone cancer
 Ewing Theory
 Ewing v. California, a U.S. Supreme Court case upholding the use of three strikes laws
 Ewing v. Goldstein, a landmark court case that helped to define the ethical duties of mental health professionals with respect to potentially violent individuals